Esteban Carpio (born July 30, 1978 in Boston, Massachusetts) is an American convicted prison inmate, serving a life sentence for the murder of a policeman in 2005.

He was convicted of the murder of Providence Police Detective Sgt. James L. Allen on April 17, 2005 at Providence Police headquarters. He was sentenced to life in prison without parole.

While Carpio was being questioned by the Providence Police for the stabbing of an 85-year-old woman, Madeline Gatta, a detective left the third-floor interview room to get water for Carpio, leaving Allen alone with Carpio. Carpio took Allen's gun and shot him twice, killing him. He then jumped out of the window and was apprehended 45 minutes later.

At his arraignment, Carpio came in wearing a mask designed to keep the offender from spitting at or biting others, with his eyes red and cheeks, forehead, and cranial region swollen, stunning the courtroom, with his family making accusations of police brutality. According to a press conference statement made at the time by Providence Police Chief Dean M. Esserman, Carpio's injuries were sustained as a result of his jump from the third floor of a building and struggle with law enforcement. At trial, Christopher Zarrella, a state police detective who helped in the arrest, testified that he had punched Carpio in the face three times. According to that day's testimony, Zarrella broke bones in Carpio's face. An FBI investigation concluded that Providence police did not use excessive force.
On June 27, 2006, a jury found Carpio guilty of the murder of Detective Allen and the stabbing of Madeline Gatta. The jury rejected Carpio's insanity defense; he was sentenced to life in prison without parole.

References

External links
Video footage
R.I. Dept. of Corrections Inmate Search 

American people convicted of murdering police officers
People convicted of murder by Rhode Island
Living people
Criminals from Rhode Island
American prisoners sentenced to life imprisonment
Prisoners sentenced to life imprisonment by Rhode Island
Police brutality in the United States
1978 births
People from Boston